The Mystery of the Missing Necklace — is a book in the series of Five Find-Outers and Dog by  Enid Blyton, published in 1947 by Methuen and illustrated by Joseph Abbey.

Plot 
Together again in the summer holidays, the Five Find-Outers are finding the hot summer rather dull - until they learn that Peterswood is apparently the headquarters of a gang of jewel thieves committing burglaries outside of the village. It appears the gang's members may be passing messages to each other in Peterswood. Fatty's voice has broken, and this allows him to use a wide range of new adult disguises, including that of an old woman selling balloons. He also disguises himself to resemble an old man who spends his afternoons sitting on a bench in the middle of the village. The children discover the old man was being used by the gang to pass on messages. They learn the gang plans to meet at a waxwork's hall, to discuss their next robbery. Fatty disguises himself as the waxwork of Napoleon so that he can listen in on the gang's meeting. Mr. Goon, however, has the same idea and disguises himself as a policeman. During the gang's meeting, Mr. Goon sneezes, giving the game away - but Fatty is caught instead. Fatty is tied up and locked in a cupboard before the gang leaves to carry out another jewelry robbery. Mr. Goon leaves Fatty locked in the cupboard to teach him a lesson, but Larry returns to the hall and frees him. The children believe that Mr. Goon has solved the mystery before them, as the jewel thieves are arrested. However, a stolen pearl necklace is still missing. The necklace is then found on the wax figure of Queen Elizabeth in the wax museum and the last member of the gang is arrested.

External links
 

Novels by Enid Blyton
1947 British novels
Methuen Publishing books
1947 children's books